The Circus is the second studio album by English synth-pop duo Erasure, released on 30 March 1987 by Mute Records in Germany and the United Kingdom and on 7 July 1987 by Sire Records in the United States. It was Erasure's second consecutive album to be produced by Flood.

The Circus became the duo's breakthrough in the UK, spawning four successful singles and reaching number six. It was an immediate success thanks to the number two UK placing of the first single "Sometimes", six months earlier. The album remains Erasure's longest-running on the UK charts.

Although mainstream success in the US did not occur with this album, it did generate two hits (including a number-one) on Billboard Hot Dance Music/Club Play chart. It also became their first record to enter the Billboard 200.

The Two Ring Circus, also released in 1987, is a double 12-inch remix album that served as a companion piece to The Circus. It includes remixes and re-recordings along with live bonus tracks on the cassette and CD versions.

Track listing
All tracks written by Andy Bell and Vince Clarke, except where noted.

2011 remastered repackage
On 4 July 2011, EMI re-released Erasure's first two albums in 2CD/DVD format. Both feature the original album remastered, plus another disc of tracks associated with the album, and a DVD containing promo videos and a live concert.

2016 "Erasure 30" 30th anniversary BMG reissue LP
Subsequent to their acquisition of Erasure's back catalogue, and in anticipation of the band's 30th anniversary, BMG commissioned reissues of all previously released UK editions of Erasure albums up to and including 2007's Light at the End of the World. All titles were pressed and distributed by Play It Again Sam on 180-gram vinyl and shrinkwrapped with a custom anniversary sticker.

2016 "30th anniversary edition" US remastered LP
In 2016, American boutique record label Intervention Records acquired access to Sire Records' US analogue masters of Erasure's Wonderland (1986) and The Circus (1987), as well as the rights to remaster and reissue them. Wonderland was released in December of that year, pressed on 180-gram vinyl and in a 60s-style Tip-On jacket. However, despite finalized art copy and announcing that production had completed for its Q1 2017 release, The Circus was withdrawn in February of that year.

Charts

Weekly charts

Year-end charts

Certifications

Release history

References

External links

1987 albums
Albums produced by Flood (producer)
Erasure albums
Mute Records albums
Sire Records albums